The Volkswagen Brasília is a rear-engined compact car, manufactured and marketed by Volkswagen in Brazil between 1974 and 1982; in Mexico from 1975 to 1982; and as knock down kits in Nigeria where it was marketed as the Igala from 1976 to 1980.

Designed to replace the Beetle (or Fusca) in the Brazilian market and originally available in a three-door and five-door hatchback body style, the Brasília combined the air-cooled engine of the Volkswagen Beetle, the chassis of the Volkswagen Karmann Ghia and styling reminiscent of the Volkswagen 412.

Developed by Volkswagen do Brasil (Volkswagen of Brazil) and internally designated as the Type 321, the Brasília was named after Brazil's capital city and by the end of 1982, over one million examples had been manufactured.

History

In September 1970, Volkswagen of Brazil's president, Rudolf Leiding, challenged the company's designers to recreate the Beetle with the Brazilian market in mind. At that time, the Beetle, the Bus and the Karmann-Ghia were the only air-cooled VWs that proved successful in Brazil. For Leiding, the new Volkswagen should be practical, economical and larger than the Beetle.
In three months, more than 40 prototypes were developed. The prototypes were expensive and VW was looking for a new cheap car, to compete with the brand new Chevette, from General Motors do Brasil.

Sales began in 1973, following its premiere in May that year. The Brasília was originally marketed as a commercial small van to take advantage of the lower tax rates on "trucks" — a classification and marketing approach that may have hampered initial sales. The Brasília was the first Brazilian hatchback with five doors, a version ultimately manufactured in small numbers and more exported than sold in Brazil.

Total production reached over one million vehicles including exports to Chile, Portugal, Bolivia, Perú, Ecuador, Venezuela, Paraguay, Mexico, Spain, Uruguay, the Philippines, and starting in March 1976, in CKD kits of the five-door to Nigeria, where it was renamed Igala. The Brasília was also assembled in Mexico from 1974 to 1982, but only in a version with two doors, appearing in an episode of El Chavo del Ocho as the car of Señor Barriga. In Brazilian media, a customized yellow Brasília was featured in the music video of "Pelados em Santos" by Mamonas Assassinas.

The Brasília's introduction received notoriety, when a reporter photographed preliminary test vehicles near the factory and security personnel fired shots — triggering Brazilian media attention, an official apology from Volkswagen, increased sales for Quatro Rodas, the magazine which purchased the photographs. The reporter, Cláudio Larangeira, was immediately hired by Quatro Rodas.

Engine and transmission

At its debut, the Brasília had a flat-four-cylinder, air-cooled boxer engine with single carburetor. The rear-engine, rear-wheel drive had a gearbox with four speeds. In the 1980s, Volkswagen also offered an ethanol-powered engine option, with 1300 cc and 49 hp. The 1974 Volkswagen Brasília, with dual carburetors, could run 10.4 km with one liter of gasoline on a highway. The urban fuel consumption is around 14 km/L.

Performance
The Brazilian car magazine Quatro Rodas tested the VW Brasília and the GM Chevette in March 1980. The Chevette's maximum speed was  while the Brasília could reach . The Chevrolet achieved 15.4 km/L and the Volkswagen achieved 13.4 km/L on a mileage comparison. The Brasília was equipped with disc brakes on the front wheels, drum brakes on the rear wheels. Beginning with model year 1977, the Brasília featured dual circuit brakes and a collapsible steering wheel modified for collision safety.

Retirement
Volkswagen of Brasil considered in 1975 the production of a front-engined, water-cooled version in order to replace the aging Beetle, however the final decision was to project and build an all new front-engined vehicle - the Volkswagen Gol. When the 1.3l engined hatchback debuted it was no direct threat to the Brasília, but with the adoption of a more powerful 1.6-litre air-cooled engine, the company chose the new project to compete against the Fiat 147, the Ford Corcel and the Chevrolet Chevette.

References

External links

VW Brasília history (in Portuguese)
VW Brazil History & Pictures (in Portuguese)
(in English)
 Christoph Bauer: Vintage: BMW 1500, DW-TV – motor mobil, 13 March 2018 (YouTube)

Brasilia
Cars of Brazil
Compact cars
Cars powered by boxer engines
Rear-wheel-drive vehicles
Cars introduced in 1973
1970s cars
1980s cars